Centrolepis pallida is a species of plant of the Restionaceae family. It is found in New Zealand (North & South Islands, and in the sub-Antarctic: Auckland Islands & Campbell Island).

References

pallida
Endemic flora of New Zealand
Plants described in 1844